The Battle of Grand Turk was a battle that occurred on 9 March 1783 during the American Revolutionary War. France had seized the Turks and Caicos archipelago, islets of rich salt works, taking the island of Grand Turk in February 1783. The British responded by deploying 28-gun frigate HMS Albemarle with a force of more than 100 men under the command of Captain Horatio Nelson. Although the mission failed, the islands were restored to Britain in the second Treaty of Paris that formally concluded the war six months later.

French capture
On 12 February 1783, a three-ship flotilla, headed by the 28-gun La Coquette under the command of the Marquis de Grasse-Briançon (nephew to Admiral Comte de Grasse) arrived at Grand Turk Island.  Disembarking about 400 men drawn from four regiments under the command of M. de Coujolles, the French took control of the island without resistance.

British recovery attempt
On 2 March 1783, the 44-gun HMS Resistance, under the command of Captain James King, while sailing in company with HMS Duguay Trouin, discovered two of the French ships anchored in Turks Island passage. On being spotted the two ships cut their cables and stood to the southwest, upon which Resistance promptly gave chase. The rearmost ship, carrying 20 guns, sprang her main topmast, and surrendered after Resistance came up and fired a broadside. She then gave chase to the other, carrying 28 guns, and after enduring fire from their stern chasers, came alongside and the Frenchman promptly surrendered. Primary accounts differ on what exactly happened next.

Schomberg's account
King decided, on the basis of the information he had gathered from the taking of La Coquette to recover Turk's Island. The British landed some 350 seamen and marines under the command of Drake Captain Charles Dixon, while the two brigs positioned themselves to cover the landing and fire on the town if necessary. However, two shore batteries (one of four 24-pounder guns and one of five 6-pounder guns) that the British had not expected opened fire on the brigs. Their fire wounded seven men on Drake and two on Barrington and forced the two brigs to withdraw. At the same time Dixon ran into a well-entrenched French force that outnumbered his landing party. He was able to extricate his force without casualties. King contemplated a second attack with the frigates, but the winds were not favorable and ultimately the British squadron withdrew.

Nelson's account
Nelson in his letter of 9 March 1783, reports that he was in command of the squadron and the operation.  Shortly after the squadron arrived at Turk's Island, Tartar left without explanation.  Nelson states that he sent Dixon under a flag of truce to ask the French commander to surrender; the demand was refused. The British then landed 167 troops, under Dixon. Unexpectedly, a shore battery of three guns opened fire on the brigs. Drake master was wounded, as were some seven men aboard the General Barrington. Dixon reported that seamen were manning the French guns and that the French troops had several field pieces. Nelson then decided to withdraw.

The Turks and Caicos Islands were returned to British control under the terms of Treaty of Paris, which was formally ratified later in 1783.

Notes

References 
Rellie, Annalisa & Hayne, Trice. Turks and Caicos IslandsBradt Travel Guides (2008). 
Black, Jeremy. A Military History of Britain: From 1775 to the Present Praeger Publishers (2006). 
Chartrand, Rene. The French Army in the American War of Independence Osprey Publishing (1992) 
The Life of Horatio Lord Nelson. Bangor House, Shoe Lane. London (1847)

Schomberg, Isaac (1802) Naval Chronology: or, An Historical Summary of Naval & Maritime Events, from the time of the Romans, to the Treaty of Peace, 1802. (T. Egerton by C. Roworth).
Annuaire de la marine
Relation des combats et des évènements de la guerre maritime brief French account.

Conflicts in 1783
Turks and Caicos
Turks and Caicos
Turks and Caicos
History of the Turks and Caicos Islands
1783 in the Caribbean